Group B of the 1996 Fed Cup Asia/Oceania Zone Group II was one of two pools in the Asia/Oceania Zone Group II of the 1996 Fed Cup. Four teams competed in a round robin competition, with the top two teams advancing to the play-offs.

Chinese Taipei vs. Brunei

Chinese Taipei vs. Uzbekistan

Pacific Oceania vs. Chinese Taipei

Pacific Oceania vs. Uzbekistan

Uzbekistan vs. Brunei

Pacific Oceania vs. Brunei

See also
Fed Cup structure

References

External links
 Fed Cup website

1996 Fed Cup Asia/Oceania Zone